David LaFrance May (December 23, 1943 – October 20, 2012) was an American professional baseball player. He played in Major League Baseball as an outfielder from  through  for the Baltimore Orioles, Milwaukee Brewers, Atlanta Braves, Texas Rangers and the Pittsburgh Pirates. May was a member of the AL pennant winning Orioles team in 1969 and, was an American League All-Star player with the Brewers in 1973. He was the father of MLB scout David May Jr. and MLB player Derrick May.

Biography
A native of New Castle, Delaware, he graduated from William Penn High School in his hometown. He signed with the San Francisco Giants as an amateur free agent in 1961. The only year he spent in the Giants organization was in 1962 with the Salem Rebels, in which he led the team with a .379 batting average.

May appeared in his first Major League game with the Baltimore Orioles. During the time he was with Baltimore (1967–1970), he never had higher than a .242 batting average and 152 at bats. He was dealt from the Orioles to the Brewers for Dick Baney and Buzz Stephen before the trade deadline on June 15, 1970. However, upon coming to the Brewers, he became an effective hitter. In his first full season in Milwaukee, May hit 16 home runs and had 65 RBI, and batted .277. He also led the league in total bases, and placed in second in hits. May is one of two Delawareans to make the All-Star Game.

May was part of a five-for-one trade that sent him, Ken Henderson, Roger Moret, Adrian Devine, Carl Morton and $200,000 from the Braves to the Rangers for Jeff Burroughs on December 9, 1976. May was traded back to Milwaukee at trade deadline in 1978 to help the team on a pennant push. As the Brewers faded, he was traded just before the August waiver wire deadline to the Pittsburgh Pirates.

May went to spring training with the Philadelphia Phillies and was their final cut before the 1979 season.  He signed and played for Santo Domingo in the fledgling Inter-American League until it went defunct during the 1979 season.  May then became a minor league coach, serving as a roving hitting instructor for the Atlanta Braves in 1981 and 1982

May was inducted into the Delaware Sports Museum and Hall of Fame in 1984.

May died at age 68 in Bear, Delaware, on October 20, 2012.

References

External links
, or SABR Biography Project

1943 births
2012 deaths
20th-century African-American sportspeople
21st-century African-American people
African-American baseball players
American expatriate baseball players in Venezuela
American League All-Stars
Atlanta Braves players
Baltimore Orioles players
Baseball players from Delaware
Cangrejeros de Santurce (baseball) players
Deaths from cancer in Delaware
Deaths from diabetes
Fox Cities Foxes players
Liga de Béisbol Profesional Roberto Clemente outfielders
Major League Baseball center fielders
Milwaukee Brewers players
People from New Castle, Delaware
Pittsburgh Pirates players
Rochester Red Wings players
Salem Rebels players
Santo Domingo Azucareros players
Stockton Ports players
Texas Rangers players
Tiburones de La Guaira players
Tri-City Atoms players